Harpal is a given name. Notable people with the name include:

Harpal Brar (born 1939), Indian communist politician, writer and businessman, based in Britain
Harpal Singh Cheema, Aam Aadmi Party MLA from Dirba Assembly Constituency in Sangrur District, Punjab
Preet Harpal, Punjabi singer songwriter and actor from Punjab, India
Harpal Kumar (born 1965), the chief executive officer of Cancer Research UK until June 2018
Harpal Singh Panwar (born 1945), Indian politician
Harpal Singh Sathi, leader of the Bharatiya Janata Party from Uttarakhand
Harpal Singh (born 1981), English former professional footballer
Harpal Singh (field hockey) (born 1983), former Indian field hockey player
Harpal Singh Sokhi, celebrity chef from India
Harpal Talhan, retired Canadian lightweight boxer
Harpal Tiwana (born 1935), prominent Punjabi playwright
Harpal Zala, Indian cricketer

See also
Chour Harpal, old part of Rawalpindi Cantonmen
Government Raja Harpal Singh College, Harpalpur, established in 1989
Raja Harpal, Pakistan, village in Sialkot District, Punjab, Pakistan
Harpal Pur, census town & village in Varanasi district in the Indian state of Uttar Pradesh
Har Pal
Haripal
Harpalini
Harpalion
Harpalpur
Harpalus
Harpalyce (disambiguation)